Knoppers  may refer to:

 Annelies Knoppers, American volleyball coach
 Bartha Knoppers (born 1951), a Canadian lawyer and an expert on the ethical aspects of genetics
 Gary N. Knoppers, a professor in the Department of Classics and Ancient Mediterranean Studies at Pennsylvania State University
 Knoppers (sweet brand) by German company August Storck

See also
 Knopper